Isabel Lestapier Winqvist (born 8 May 1987) is a former Miss Sweden titleholder who resigned.

Biography
Winqvist was born  in Helsingborg, Scania, Sweden and studied business and social science at upper secondary school. She studied at ProCivitas Private Gymnasium. She is now in law school. She won the Miss Sweden pageant in her home town, Helsingborg, after several months of a recruitment process. She is the second delegate to be elected by the Panos Emporio Corporation. The competition was televised in eight countries, and therefore all the contestants spoke English. She was crowned on 21 April 2007 by her precursor, Josephine Alhanko, who was semi-finalist at the Miss Universe 2006 pageant, held in Hollywood.

The day after the coronation it became known that she had been featured in the Swedish edition of FHM. Having featured in erotic photographs was against the rules for Miss Sweden contestants, but since she had only featured on bikini pictures rather than topless or in the nude, the owner of the Miss Sweden brand, Panos Emporio, took the decision not to disqualify Winqvist. Despite this, she decided to resign from the title 25 June 2007, citing communication problems with the Swedish sponsors. She had the shortest Swedish reign of all times. Her first runner-up, Lina Hahne became the new titleholder.

Isabel Lestapier Winqvist married Peter London, bassist from the Swedish glam metal band Crashdïet, on 25 June 2010 at the Hedvig Eleonora Church in Stockholm. The couple got divorced in March 2012.

In July 2014, Isabel Lestapier Winqvist married businessman Hans Isoz in Stockholm. In May 2015, their daughter Henrietta was born.

References

External links
Report about Miss Sweden 2007
Video capture of Miss Sweden

Swedish female models
Beauty pageant controversies
Living people
1987 births
Swedish beauty pageant winners
People from Helsingborg